Neuvy-au-Houlme is a commune in the Orne department in northwestern France.

Neuvy-au-Houlme is the site of the historic Thoroughbred horse breeding farm, Haras de Fresnay-le-Buffard, and the standardbred farm, Haras du Ribardon.

See also
 Communes of the Orne department

References

Neuvyauhoulme